The Ten Accomplished Youth Organizations (TAYO) Awards is the sole award-giving program that "recognizes and supports the outstanding contributions of youth organizations" in the Philippines. It is organized and presented annually by the Ten Accomplished Youth Organizations (TAYO) Awards Foundation since 2012. 

The TAYO Awards was one of the flagship programs of the National Youth Commission until 2019. It is the most prestigious award given to youth groups in the Philippines.

Background 
The TAYO Awards was founded by Senator Francis Pangilinan in partnership with the then National Youth Commission (NYC) Chairperson Bam Aquino in 2002. Since its establishment, the program has accommodated at least 250 nominations annually. Throughout the years, it has also gathered corporate sponsors to give out special awards to its nominees.

The TAYO Awards was one of the flagship programs of the National Youth Commission until 2019 under Ronald Cardema's term as the Commission's Chairperson and CEO. Cardema's term in 2019, the National Youth Commission stopped sponsoring the award-giving program to establish the President Rodrigo Roa Duterte Youth Leadership Awards which eventually did not materialize.

Process

Criteria 
The program is open to clubs, groups, organizations, and societies whose membership and leadership are composed of at least five (5) members whose ages are 30 years old and below. The criteria for judging are as follows:

 The project’s impact on its stakeholders
 The project’s means of harnessing the spirit of volunteerism
 The project’s creativity and innovation
 The project’s sustainability; 
 The project’s effective use of resources

Categories 
Participating organizations compete per category and organizations can submit multiple entries to different categories provided that each project is different. Only the four best organizations per category will be invited to the second phase of the program. The categories are:

 Education and Technology
 Health, Well-being, and Human Development
 Environment, Disaster Risk Reduction, and Climate Change Adaptation
 Livelihood and Entrepreneurship
 Culture, Arts, and Heritage

Rewards 
The program's winners receive a specially commissioned trophy sculpted by Toym De Leon Imao and a grant of Php 50,000 intended to fund new projects or to continue long-term programs. Special tokens are also given by the program's partners which, in the past years, have included Coca-Cola Philippines, San Miguel Corporation, Jollibee Foods Corporation, Lenovo, and PLDT-Smart.

Awardees 
For a more comprehensive list, see List of TAYO Awards winners
De La Salle Debate Society (2012) for the World United Debate Championships
University of San Agustin Little Theater (2015) for theater production series for Typhoon Yolanda victims
University of the Philippines Los Banos Genetic Researchers and Agricultural Innovators Society (2018) for LakBioteknolohiya
Enactus UP Los Banos (2017) for their Amiga Philippines (now Tagani)

References 

Youth organizations based in the Philippines
Philippine awards